William Slosson Lincoln (August 13, 1813 – April 21, 1893) was a U.S. Representative from New York.

Born in Berkshire (now Newark Valley), Tioga County, New York, Lincoln attended the common schools.
He studied law.
He was admitted to the bar.
He engaged in mercantile pursuits and subsequently in the manufacture of leather.
Postmaster of Newark Valley from September 20, 1838, to February 24, 1841, and from December 19, 1844, to September 19, 1866.
He served as supervisor in 1841, 1844, 1865, and 1866.
He was a Justice of the Peace in 1852 and 1855.

Lincoln was elected as a Republican to the Fortieth Congress (March 4, 1867 – March 3, 1869).
He was not a candidate for reelection.
He engaged in the practice of law in Washington, D.C., until his death on April 21, 1893.
He was interred in Oak Hill Cemetery in Washington, D.C.

Sources

External links

1813 births
1893 deaths
Burials at Oak Hill Cemetery (Washington, D.C.)
Republican Party members of the United States House of Representatives from New York (state)
New York (state) postmasters
19th-century American politicians